Eliazar Guzmán (born 30 January 1932) was a Chilean former sports shooter. He competed in the 25 metre pistol event at the 1956 Summer Olympics.

References

External links
 

1932 births
Possibly living people
Chilean male sport shooters
Olympic shooters of Chile
Shooters at the 1956 Summer Olympics
Place of birth missing (living people)
20th-century Chilean people